Worldvision may refer to:
 World Vision, an international Christian relief and development organization
 Worldvision Enterprises, a television program and home video distributor